The 1990 Zambian coup d'état attempt was a military coup d'état attempt that took place in Zambia on 1 July 1990. The coup lasted no more than 6 hours and took place between 3 and 9 A.M. when the coup's leader, Lieutenant Mwamba Luchembe of the Zambian Army, announced via the ZNBC (national radio station) that the military had taken over the government and he cited riots of the previous week as reasons for his action; about 27 people had died in the riots, while more than 100 were wounded. Although Lieutenant Luchembe's coup attempt against the then President Kenneth Kaunda failed, it weakened Kaunda's political power, which was already shaky after three days of rioting.

See also
History of Zambia
1997 Zambian coup d'état attempt

References

Coup
Zambia
Military coups in Zambia
July 1990 events in Africa
1990s coups d'état and coup attempts